Gureyev or Gureev is a Russian-language surname.The feminine form of this name is Gureyeva or Gureeva.

Notable people who share this surname include:

Lyudmila Gureyeva (1943–2017),Soviet volleyball player
Zhanna Gureyeva (born 1970),Belarusian triple jumper

Russian-language surnames